This list comprises all players who have participated in at least one league match for the current Tampa Bay Rowdies (formally known as FC Tampa Bay) since the club took the pitch in 2010. Players who were on the roster but never played a first team game are not listed; players who appeared for the team in other competitions (US Open Cup, CONCACAF Champions League, etc.) but never actually made a league appearance are noted at the bottom of the page where appropriate. A "†" denotes players who only appeared in a single match.

Note: For notable players from the original Tampa Bay Rowdies, refer to this list: Tampa Bay Rowdies (1975–1993)#Notable players

A
  Eddie Ababio †
  Kwame Adjeman-Pamboe
  Freddy Adu
  Gale Agbossoumonde
  Andre Akpan
  Kalif Alhassan
  Mike Ambersley
  Stefan Antonijevic
  Dan Antoniuk
  Andres Arango
  Jeff Attinella
  Eric Avila

B
  Rich Balchan
  Kerry Baptiste
  Etienne Barbara
  Luke Boden
  Zak Boggs
  Deshorn Brown
  Scott Buete
  Junior Burgos
  Chad Burt

C
  Stuart Campbell
  Justin Chavez
  Jeremy Christie
  Matt Clare
  Kyle Clinton
  Joe Cole
  Neill Collins
  Kamil Čontofalský
  Carl Cort
  Jamael Cox †
  Raphael Cox

D
  Devin Del Do
  Yendry Diaz
  Alex Dixon
  Joe Donoho

E
  Darwin Espinal
  Fernando Mauricio Escobar

F
  Leo Fernandes
  Akira Fitzgerald
  Andrew Fontein
  Evans Frimpong

G
  Jordan Gafa
  Maykel Galindo
  Hunter Gorskie
  Sebastián Guenzatti
  Juan Guerra
  Mozzi Gyorio

H
  David Hayes
  Tom Heinemann
  Robert Hernández
  Corey Hertzog
  Shane Hill
  Georgi Hristov
  Willie Hunt

J
  Omar Jarun
  Darwin Jones

K
  Aaron King
  Darnell King
  Gordon Kljestan

L
  Christophe Lallet
  Josh Lambo
  Damion Lowe

M
  Tony McManus
  Richard Menjívar
  Jeff Michaud
  Pascal Millien
  Cody Mizell
  Tamika Mkandawire
  Lucky Mkosana
  Alex Morrell
  Ricardo Morris
  Justin Morrow
  Luke Mulholland
  Danny Mwanga

N
  Michael Nanchoff
  Jay Needham
  Evan Newton
  Adam Nowland †
  Martin Nuñez
  Stanley Nyazamba

O
  Dan O'Brien
  Luciano Olguín

P
  Martin Paterson
  PC
  Fafà Picault
  Matt Pickens
  Kyle Porter
  Zac Portillos
  Carlos Preciado

R
  Walter Ramírez
  Diego Restrepo
  Wálter Restrepo
  J. P. Rodrigues
  Darel Russell

S
  Omar Salgado †
  Ricardo Sánchez
  Frank Sanfilippo
  Maicon Santos
  Marcelo Saragosa
  Daryl Sattler
  Keith Savage
  Marcel Schäfer
  Daniel Scott
  Brian Shriver
  Jonny Steele
  Ben Sweat

T
  Long Tan
  Graham Tatters
  Ryan Thompson
  Casey Townsend
  Paul Tolley

U
  Warren Ukah
  Erik Ustruck

V
  Julian Valentin
  Verneri Välimaa
  Rob Valentino
  Martin Vingaard

W
  Blake Wagner
  Amani Walker
  Anthony Wallace
  Draymond Washington
  Kwame Watson-Siriboe
  Aaron Wheeler
  Martin West

Y
  Takuya Yamada
  Drew Yates
  Tsuyoshi Yoshitake

Sources
FC Tampa Bay

 
Tampa Bay Rowdies
Association football player non-biographical articles
roster